"Nobody" is a song by American singer-songwriter Keith Sweat featuring Athena Cage from the band Kut Klose. The song spent three weeks at  1 on the US Billboard Hot R&B Singles chart and reached No. 3 on the Billboard Hot 100. Internationally, it reached No. 9 in New Zealand, No. 10 in the Netherlands, No. 16 in Canada, and No. 22 in Australia. The music video for the single features a young Mekhi Phifer.

Track listings

US 7-inch, CD, and cassette single
 "Nobody" (radio edit) – 4:10
 "In the Mood" – 3:48

UK CD single
 "Nobody" (Vybe '97 Mix) – 4:24
 "Nobody" (Vybe '97 Part II) – 4:24
 "Nobody" (album version) – 4:22
 "Nobody" (Vibe Mix instrumental)

UK 12-inch single
A1. "Nobody" (Vybe '97 Mix) – 4:19
A2. "Nobody" (Vybe '97 Part II) – 4:22
B1. "Nobody" (Vibe Mix instrumental) – 4:23
B2. "Nobody" (album version) – 4:20

UK cassette single
 "Nobody" (Vybe '97 Mix) – 4:24
 "Nobody" (album version) – 4:23

European CD single
 "Nobody" (radio edit) – 4:10
 "In the Mood" (LP version) – 3:46
 "Why Me Baby?" (LP version) – 5:28

Australian CD single
 "Nobody" (radio edit) – 4:10
 "Nobody" (Ghetto Love Mix) – 4:11
 "Nobody" (The Chanz Remix) – 4:57
 "Nobody" (Deep End Remix) – 4:47
 "Nobody" (Deep End Club Mix extended) – 5:59

Credits and personnel
Credits are lifted from the US and UK CD singles liner notes.

Studio
 Recorded at the Sweat Shop (Atlanta, Georgia, US)
 Mixed at Southern Tracks (Atlanta, Georgia, US)

Personnel
 Keith Sweat – composition, lyrics, vocals, background vocals, production, executive production
 Fitzgerald Scott – composition, background vocals, keyboard and drum programming
 Athena Cage – lyrics, vocals
 Karl Heilbron – bass guitar, engineering, mixing
 Caram Costanzo – additional engineering, mixing assistant
 Larry Cianelli – editing

Charts

Weekly charts

Year-end charts

All-time charts

Certifications

Release history

See also
 R&B number-one hits of 1996 (USA)

References

1996 singles
1996 songs
Keith Sweat songs
Male–female vocal duets
Songs written by Keith Sweat
Songs written by Athena Cage
1990s ballads